Subhash Sureshchandra Deshmukh (born 12 March 1957) is an Indian politician and a member of the Bharatiya Janata Party (BJP). Deshmukh represents the Solapur South constituency in the Maharashtra Legislative Assembly. He served as the Cabinet Minister of Co-Operation, Relief and Rehabilitation in the Government of Maharashtra.

Positions held

Lokmangal Group
Deshmukh is the founder of Lokmangal Group.

Deshmukh is the founder of Solapur Social Foundation.

Within BJP

Vice President, BJP Maharashtra (2010-2013)

Legislative

Member, Solapur - 2004-2009
Member, Maharashtra Legislative Assembly - 2014
Cabinet Minister for Co-Operation, Marketing & Textiles, Maharashtra State, 2016-2019
Cabinet Minister for Co-Operation, Relief and Rehabilitation, Maharashtra State, 2019–Present

Early life
Subhash Sureshchandra Deshmukh was born on 12 March 1957 in Wadala (North Solapur). He belongs to the family who believes in discipline, education, social commitment and religious accountability. Being primary school teachers, his parents were known for their disciplined personalities. While handling farming, they served for education. Having Wari tradition in the home, he was raised in the devotional atmosphere. He was raised with values such as hard work, discipline, patriotism and social work.

Political career

He took oath as Maharashtra Cabinet Minister on 7 July 2016. He was allotted Ministry of Co-Operation, Relief and Rehabilitation.

Organizational skills and communication skills are his notable qualities. Knowing that unity is the ultimate success, he connected the ones who wanted to work for the progress of Solapur.

His thoughts on addiction free youth, healthy body for social welfare, utilization of money for good deeds, trouble-free problem solving, patriotism, collective efforts against corruption etc. are inspiring today's youth.

January 1998 : Won the Legislative Council election as MLA, Solapur

2000 : BJP District President, Tarun Bharat President, Solapur

2004 : Maharashtra Sahakar Aghadi: State President, Maharashtra State, Won Lok Sabha Election from Solapur Lok Sabha Constituency and was elected as MP

2009 : Madha Lok Sabha Election, Osmanabad-Tuljapur Legislative Assembly (Vidhan Sabha) Election

2014 : BJP State Vice President, Maharashtra State, Won Legislative Assembly (Vidhan Sabha) Election

2016 : He took oath as a Maharashtra Cabinet Minister on 7 July 2016. He was allotted the Ministry of Co-operation, Marketing  

and Textiles.

See also
Devendra Fadnavis ministry (2014–)
Politics of Maharashtra
Government of Maharashtra
Narendra Modi

References

Living people
1957 births
Bharatiya Janata Party politicians from Maharashtra
People from Solapur
India MPs 2004–2009
Marathi politicians
Lok Sabha members from Maharashtra
Maharashtra MLAs 2014–2019